APA Corporation is the holding company for Apache Corporation, an American company engaged in hydrocarbon exploration. It is organized in Delaware and headquartered in Houston. The company is ranked 431st on the Fortune 500.

Current operations

As of December 31, 2021, the company had  of estimated proved reserves, of which 68% was in the United States, 20% was in Egypt, and 12% was in the North Sea.

Almost all of the company's reserves in the United States are in the Permian Basin. The company also has reserves in western Oklahoma, the Texas Panhandle, and south Texas.

The company has been operating in remote areas of the Libyan Desert in Egypt since 1994 and has not experienced disruptions from political turmoil.

The company has been operating in the North Sea since 2003, predominantly in the Forties oilfield.

History
In 1954, the Apache Oil Corporation was founded in Minneapolis, Minnesota, by Truman Anderson, Raymond Plank and Charles Arnao with $250,000 in funding.

In 1955, the first wells were drilled in the Cushing field, between Tulsa and Oklahoma City.

In 1960, the company acquired interests in the Foshay Tower, a Minneapolis landmark. The 32-story imitation of the Washington Monument, became the company's headquarters from the early 1960s until 1984.

In 1967, the oil well Fagerness #1 was drilled, yielding the company's first major discovery.

In 1969, the company became a public company via an initial public offering.

In 1970, the company diversified into agriculture with the acquisition of the S&J Ranch in California. The ranch produced citrus fruit, figs, pistachios, olives, and almonds. It was sold in 1987.

In 1971, the company formed Apache Exploration Company (subsequently "Apexco") as its oil and gas operating company.

In 1977, the company sold Apexco and its non-petroleum holdings, including the ranch, and reinvested into a farm-in agreement with GHK to operate its wells in the Anadarko Basin.

In 1980, the company acquired a non-operating interest, via a participation in a Royal Dutch Shell joint venture, in operations in the Gulf Of Mexico.

In 1981, the company created Apache Petroleum Company (APC), the first public master limited partnership in the United States.

In 1985, the company acquired oil and gas wells in eight states from David Holdings for $200 million. In 1986, the company acquired oil and gas assets in the Gulf of Mexico from Occidental Petroleum.

In 1987, the company moved its headquarters from Minneapolis to Denver.

In 1991, the company doubled its reserves by acquiring assets from Amoco, including a position in the Permian Basin of West Texas, for $515 million and 2 million shares of the company.

In 1992, the company moved its headquarters to Houston, Texas and signed a lease for 220,000 square feet of office space.

In 1993, the company acquired Hadson Energy Resources in a $58 million transaction, expanding its assets to offshore Western Australia.

In 1994, the company began operations in Egypt by acquiring a 25 percent non-operated interest in the Qarun Concession, operated by the Phoenix Resource Companies. Production began in December 1995.

In 1995, the company acquired Dekalb Energy Canada, marking the company's return to Canada, in a $285 million stock transaction.

In 1995, the company also acquired 315 oil and gas fields in the Permian Basin, the Texas-Louisiana Gulf Coast, western Oklahoma, East Texas, the Rocky Mountains and the Gulf of Mexico from Texaco.

In 1996, the company acquired Phoenix Resources and took over operations of the Qarun Concession in Egypt.

In 1999, the company acquired fields and leases in the Gulf of Mexico from Royal Dutch Shell for $715 million in cash, plus 1 million shares of stock.

In 2001, the company acquired operations in the Libyan Desert of Egypt from Repsol for $410 million.

In 2002, the company drilled its first deepwater wells in the West Mediterranean Concession of offshore Egypt.

In 2003, the company acquired the Forties oilfield, the largest field ever discovered in the United Kingdom North Sea as well as assets in the Gulf of Mexico from BP for $1.3 billion.

In May 2005, the company and ExxonMobil completed a series of agreements that provided for transfers and joint ventures across a broad range of properties in Western Canada.

In October 2005, the company sold its 55% stake in the deepwater section of Egypt's concession for $413 million to Hess Corporation.

In April 2006, the company acquired Gulf of Mexico Shelf properties from BP.

In June 2006, the company sold its oil production interest in China to Australia-based Roc Oil Company for US$260 million.

In 2007, A test horizontal well at the Van Gogh project, in Exmouth Gulf, Western Australia, produced 9,694 barrels per day.

In February 2010, the company started production from the Van Gogh development offshore Western Australia.

In March 2010, a Federal judge upheld the company's decision to exclude from its annual meeting ballot a corporate governance proposal from a person who had not proven on a timely basis that he actually was one of the company's shareholders.

In June 2010, the company acquired assets in the Gulf of Mexico from Devon Energy for $1.05 billion.

In July 2010, the company acquired assets from BP in Texas, southeast New Mexico, western Canada, and Egypt for $7 billion.

In November 2010, the company acquired Mariner Energy for $2.7 billion.

In 2011, the company discovered eight oil wells in Egypt's Faghur Basin.

In January 2012, the company acquired assets in the Beryl field in the North Sea from ExxonMobil.

In May 2012, the company acquired Cordillera Energy Partners for $2.5 billion in cash and 6.3 million shares of common stock.

In November 2013, the company sold a non-controlling 1/3 share of its Egyptian assets to Sinopec

In 2015, the company sold its assets in Western Australia for $2.1 billion.

In 2016, the company sold its interest in the Scottish Area Gas Evacuation pipeline.

In 2017, the company sold its assets in Canada to Paramount Resources for C$459.5 million.

In 2020, the company declared its 'Alpine High' discovery to be a failure despite spending $3 billion on the play. Steven Keenan, VP of global exploration and Lead Geologist on the play resigned.

In January 2021, the company redid its agreement with the Egyptian General Petroleum Corporation.

In March 2021, the company reorganized its legal structure, with APA Corporation becoming the holding company for all of its subsidiaries.

Controversies

2013 toxic waste spill
On June 1, 2013, a pipeline in northern Alberta, Canada was noticed to have ruptured, spilling 60,000 barrels (9.5 million litres) of toxic waste in what was cited as one of the largest of such disasters in recent history in North America.

Pipeline explosion
In June 2008, the natural gas pipeline explosion at the company's processing hub on Varanus Island led to the 2008 Western Australian gas crisis. The Australian government was forced to drop charges as a result of a technicality.

Attempts to limit shareholder proposals
In 2007, CEO G. Steven Farris wrote to the U.S. Securities and Exchange Commission in favor of limits on nonbinding shareholder proposals at public company annual meetings.

References

External links

1960s initial public offerings
American companies established in 1954
Companies based in Denver
Companies based in Houston
Companies listed on the Nasdaq
Companies formerly listed on the New York Stock Exchange
Economy of Oklahoma
Energy companies established in 1954
Natural gas companies of Canada
Oil companies of Canada
Oil companies of the United States